Menomonee can refer to:
United States
Little Menomonee River in Ozaukee and Milwaukee counties, Wisconsin
Menomonee, Wisconsin, former town
Menomonee Falls, Wisconsin, village
Menomonee River in Washington, Waukesha, and Milwaukee counties in Wisconsin
Menomonee River Valley, Milwaukee
Menomonee (sculpture), a public artwork by Hilary Goldblatt in Milwaukee, Wisconsin

See also 
 Menominee (disambiguation) 
 Menomonie (disambiguation)